Terence Faherty (born 1954) is an American author of mystery novels.

Personal
Faherty was born in Trenton, New Jersey.  He graduated from Rider College and became a technical writer at a bank in Indianapolis, Indiana, where he currently lives with his wife, Jan.  He wrote his first novel, Deadstick, in 1981, but it was rejected for publication.  In 1990, he was encouraged to resubmit the manuscript to St. Martin's Press, which published it.

Books
Faherty was nominated for an Edgar Award for Deadstick, his debut novel. Come Back Dead was honored with the 1997 Shamus Award for best Best Private Eye Novel. Faherty has also written two mystery series.

The Owen Keane Mysteries 
The Owen Keane series are contemporary novels whose main character dropped out of a Roman Catholic seminary based on the School of Theology at St. Meinrad Archabbey. The series contains seven novels and one collection of short stories:
 Deadstick - 1991
 Live to Regret - 1992
 The Lost Keats - 1993 (a "prequel" to Deadstick)
 Die Dreaming - 1994
 Prove the Nameless - 1996
 The Ordained - 1998
 Orion Rising - 2001
 Eastward in Eden - 2013
 The Confessions of Owen Keane (short stories) - Crippen & Landru, 2005

The Scott Elliott Mysteries 
The Scott Elliott books are set in post-World War II Hollywood, when the glamor of old Hollywood was fading. Elliott, a former actor and soldier turned private security operative, fights a rearguard action throughout the series, trying to protect the dying Hollywood, for which, as he might put it, he carries a torch.
 Kill Me Again - 1996
 Come Back Dead - 1997
 Raise the Devil - 2000 
 In a Teapot - 2005
 Dance in the Dark - 2011
 Play a Cold Hand - 2017
 The Hollywood Op (short stories) - Perfect Crime, 2011

References

External links 
 Official Web Site 
 Profile of Terence Faherty from Indy.com 
 Terence Faherty, from Conversations with American Writers: The doubt, the faith, the in-between 
 Terence Faherty Bibliography from biblio.com 

1954 births
Living people
20th-century American novelists
21st-century American novelists
American male novelists
American mystery writers
Macavity Award winners
Writers from Trenton, New Jersey
Writers from Indianapolis
Shamus Award winners
20th-century American male writers
21st-century American male writers
Novelists from New Jersey
Novelists from Indiana